The Broadway Junction station is a New York City Subway station complex shared by the elevated BMT Canarsie Line and BMT Jamaica Line, and the underground IND Fulton Street Line. It was also served by trains of the Fulton Street Elevated until that line closed in 1956. It is located roughly at the intersection of Broadway, Fulton Street and Van Sinderen Avenue at the border of Bedford–Stuyvesant and East New York, Brooklyn. The complex is served by the A, J, and L trains at all times; the C train at all times except late nights; and the Z train during rush hours in the peak direction only.

The station is adjacent to the East New York Yard and a complex track junction between the tracks leading to the yard, the Canarsie Line, and the Jamaica Line. The structure of the elevated station still contains the ironwork for the trackways used by the old Fulton Elevated. The station has a single exit and entrance through a fare control building located at the eastern end of the Fulton Street Line station. There is evidence of closed exits from the Jamaica Line platforms.

The station opened as Manhattan Junction as part of the BMT Lexington Avenue Line in 1885. In 1900, an elevated connection was made with the Fulton Street Elevated, resulting in a change in service patterns. Lexington Avenue and Fulton Street trains were through-routed, going around the East New York Loop, with service to Cypress Hills requiring a transfer. The station started to be used by service to Canarsie in 1906. In 1919, the Manhattan Junction station was replaced by the current station which was then known as Eastern Parkway. The modern-day Canarsie Line platforms, known as Broadway Junction, opened in 1928 when that line was connected to the 14th Street–Eastern District Line. The Independent Subway System's Fulton Street Line was extended to Broadway–East New York in 1946, and the three stations were combined as one station complex on July 1, 1948. The names of the stations in the complex were conformed to Broadway Junction in 2003.

Although Broadway Junction ranked 166th in the system for passenger entries in 2016, with 3,085,401 total entries, it is Brooklyn's third-busiest station in terms of passenger activity. It sees 100,000 passengers per day , the vast majority of whom use it to make transfers. In 2017, the New York City Economic Development Corporation started studying options to rezone the surrounding area as a transit hub.



History 

The Broadway Junction station complex is shared by the elevated BMT Canarsie and BMT Jamaica Lines and the underground IND Fulton Street Line. Throughout the history of the area, this has been a key junction point between various different rail lines. What is now Broadway Junction sits atop the historical Jamaica Pass, the junction of the modern Broadway, Fulton Street, and Jamaica Avenue. The Pass is where these roads passed through the valleys of the area, which are part of the terminal moraine created by the Wisconsin glaciation.

The first rail service in the area was the Atlantic Branch of the Long Island Rail Road (LIRR) at East New York station. The line opened as the Brooklyn and Jamaica Railroad in 1836, under lease to the LIRR, but did not include a station at East New York until early 1843. The Brooklyn and Rockaway Beach Railroad (the predecessor to the BMT Canarsie Line) began service in the area in 1865. The name Manhattan Junction or Manhattan Beach Junction was applied to the station on what is now the Jamaica Line when it opened in 1885; the area had been known as Manhattan Beach Crossing since before then, due to the crossing of the LIRR's Manhattan Beach Division. A station on the Fulton Street Elevated railroad at Sackman Street opened on July 4, 1889, when the line was extended to Atlantic Avenue.

A two-track, one-half-block elevated connection was built on the east side of Vesta Avenue (now Van Sinderen Avenue) between the Fulton Street and Broadway Lines. This connection, equipped with a third rail to supply electric power, was opened on August 9, 1900, and new service patterns were implemented: during times other than rush hours, Lexington Avenue and Fulton Street trains were through-routed, and travel beyond Manhattan Junction required a transfer. This "East New York Loop" was unpopular, and was soon stopped; the next service to use the tracks was the BMT Canarsie Line to Broadway Ferry (later the 15 train), joined to the Fulton Street Line at Pitkin and Snediker Avenues in 1906.

The name was changed from Manhattan Junction to Broadway Junction in 1913. The Dual Contracts were signed on March 19, 1913, between the City and the Interborough Rapid Transit Company and the Brooklyn Rapid Transit Company (BRT). As part of the agreement, the BRT, which owned the elevated lines in Brooklyn, agreed to construct bidirectional express tracks on the Fulton and Broadway Elevateds. The Broadway express track was placed into service on December 23, 1916. The current Broadway Elevated station at Eastern Parkway opened on August 5, 1919, replacing the old Manhattan Junction station. The full BMT 14th Street-Canarsie Line was completed on July 14, 1928, with the opening of the segment connecting Broadway Junction with Montrose Avenue.

By 1936, the Independent Subway System's Fulton Street Line had been extended to Rockaway Avenue. At that time, Broadway Junction was an all-Brooklyn–Manhattan Transit (BMT) transfer point. Further eastward extension of the line was delayed by World War II; the Broadway–East New York station opened on December 30, 1946. A direct escalator passageway was constructed between the IND and BMT stations in East New York to allow passengers free transfers. The passageway opened on July 1, 1948. The Fulton Street Elevated was now redundant, and BMT service on the line closed entirely on April 26, 1956, with the eastern portion to Lefferts Boulevard connected to the IND.

The entire complex was renovated from 1999 to 2001. The design bid for the project was awarded in May 1996. As part of the project, an abandoned mezzanine and adjacent staircases were removed, a new station booth was built and the public address system was improved. In 2001, as part of the work a piece of artwork made by Al Loving titled Brooklyn, New Morning was installed in the station. This installation was part of MTA Arts & Design's program to install artwork in stations that undergo rehabilitations. Other necessary improvements were also completed as part of the project. For a long time, the stations within the complex went by three different names: the original Eastern Parkway on the BMT Jamaica Line, Broadway Junction on the BMT Canarsie Line, and Broadway–East New York (IND Fulton Street Line). Conformity between the station names was established in 2003.

As part of a project initiated in 2017 in which 200 blocks of land in East New York were rezoned for housing and improvements to area parks and schools were planned, the New York City Economic Development Corporation initiated a study to foster economic growth around Broadway Junction as a transit hub with residential and commercial uses. In 2018, the MTA announced several further improvements to the Broadway Junction station: new elevators for the Fulton Street Line platforms, as well as staircases for the Canarsie Line platforms and Jamaica Line platforms.

Station layout

The station complex is composed of three stations: the two elevated stations on the BMT Jamaica and Canarsie Lines, as well as the underground station on the IND Fulton Street Line. The IND station is accessible from the station's ground-level station house, at the east end of the station complex, using staircases down to platform level. The BMT lines are reachable from that same station house via escalators from street level to the upper mezzanine, which is located over the elevated BMT Jamaica Line platforms and at the BMT Canarsie Line's platform level. The two escalators, which were replaced in 2000, are long and steep. A footbridge leads from the upper mezzanine to the BMT Canarsie Line's northbound platform.

Despite having been renovated in the late 1990s, the Broadway Junction complex does not conform to the Americans with Disabilities Act of 1990, and there are no elevators in the station because the different parts of the complex are too far from each other. Because Broadway Junction is a major transfer station, the community identified this lack of access as a major issue. Calls for elevators were renewed in 2017, after the announcement of the L train shutdown in 2019–2020, which temporarily restricts Canarsie Line service to Manhattan during off-peak hours. In January 2018, the MTA announced that the IND Fulton Street Line platforms would receive elevators, and that elevators were also being studied for the BMT Jamaica Line platforms. However, the BMT Canarsie Line platforms are not expected to receive these improvements.

Exit

The fare control area is in the station house, with a token booth and turnstile banks. The structure was built along with the IND station. The station house leads to Van Sinderen Avenue between Fulton Street to the south, and Truxton Street and Broadway to the north. This is the only entrance to the entire complex. There is also a police precinct located in the station house, NYPD Transit Police District 33, at the south end of the building. The station was previously part of Transit Police District 23. The station house is adjacent to Callahan-Kelly Playground, and is recessed a short distance west from Van Sinderen Avenue.

A ventilation structure for the IND line sits at the west end of the park at Sackman Street. There have been planning studies to build a new entrance in this area.

BMT Canarsie Line platforms 

The Broadway Junction station on the BMT Canarsie Line has two tracks, one island platform, and one side platform. Manhattan-bound trains use the island platform for northbound service while Canarsie-bound trains use the side platform for southbound service, similar to the configuration of the Bowling Green station on the IRT Lexington Avenue Line. However, unlike Bowling Green, the southbound trains can use the island platform if necessary.

This station opened on July 14, 1928, as the final section of the 14th Street–Eastern District Line, now part of the Canarsie Line, opened between Montrose Avenue and Broadway Junction. This new line allowed trains from Canarsie to run via the 14th Street Line in Manhattan in addition to the Nassau Street Line. The station is one of the highest elevated platforms in the city, sitting above the already-elevated BMT Jamaica Line. As high as this station platform is, it plunges abruptly into a tunnel at the north end. A diamond crossover was installed here between 1998 and 2001.

The south end of the northbound platform divides into two, with a central gap between the two legs. Two normally-unused tracks connect the Canarsie and Jamaica lines. The southbound track can be seen emerging beneath the two legs of the northbound platform; the northbound flyover with its severe curve can be seen just east of the station, beginning near the signal tower. During 1999, this station underwent a series of renovations, including new canopies, a new crossover (known as 'The Barn' because of its rustic red siding and white trim), and the removal of a hazardous crossunder. The old-style platform lights were removed and replaced with light fixtures that curve upward and split into two lights, widely seen elsewhere in the system. In March 2018, in preparation for the L train shutdown, the MTA announced that it would be installing two extra staircases to the BMT Canarsie Line platforms; at the time, there was only one passageway to each platform.

BMT Jamaica Line platforms 

The Broadway Junction station is an express station on the BMT Jamaica Line that has three tracks and two island platforms. The middle express track is not used by regular service. At each end of the station there are track connections to the East New York Yard. Trains that run to or from that yard can terminate or begin at this station.

The station was originally called Eastern Parkway station, named for its original exit on the extreme west end of the platforms. This entrance is now closed, though the street stairs and station house are still present, now being used as employee space. A second fare control area, a mezzanine, at Conway Street in the middle of the platforms was also closed, and was removed in the 2000s as part of the station's renovation. The ironwork for the old Fulton Elevated trackways can be seen under this portion of the complex from the platforms. Two staircases from each platform lead to the upper mezzanine of the complex. The mezzanine is above the platforms and connects to the Canarsie Line and to the exit at street level via two long escalators. At street level, there is a transfer to the underground IND Fulton Street Line and the fare control area.

As part of the 2015–2019 Metropolitan Transportation Authority's Capital Program, station capacity enhancements were made at the station. The project involved the building of two additional staircases from each platform to the mezzanine to reduce platform congestion. Design work started in February 2017, and was finished in August 2017.

IND Fulton Street Line platforms 

The Broadway Junction station on the IND Fulton Street Line, formerly called Broadway–East New York station, is a standard express station with four tracks and two island platforms.

The land for the station was acquired by the city in 1938, and in order to construct the station and other utilities, the land had to be cleared of buildings. Some of the land was given to the New York City Parks Department in 1945 for the construction of Callahan-Kelly Playground, which was named after two local soldiers who died during World War I. The station was nearly complete when the United States' entrance into World War II in 1941 halted construction due to material shortages. Work resumed following the war to install the necessary signals, tracks and complete the escalators to the BMT platforms. The contract for the  escalator was awarded on November 7, 1945, to the Otis Elevator Company. The station opened on December 30, 1946, while the escalator was completed on July 1, 1948, after supply delays.

The station's tile band is unique in that it incorporates two types of tile–gloss and matte–in contrasting shades of cobalt blue (gloss border) and blueberry (matte center). When the station was renamed in 2003, the "EAST NY" tiles on the wall were removed and replaced by tiles reading "JUNCTION", in a very closely matching IND font. There is an active control tower just past the head end of the Queens-bound platform.

East of the station, the tunnel widens on both sides to accommodate an additional trackway diverging from the local tracks. These bellmouths, one of which has an emergency exit, were built for a proposed extension along the BMT Jamaica Line, or for a proposed Jamaica Avenue Subway. They were not a provision for the IND Second System, as were similar structures on other IND lines, but rather date from an earlier plan for the IND Fulton Street Line, which would have connected the IND tracks west of the station to two lines to the east of the station: the BMT Jamaica Line tracks, and the BMT Fulton Street Line tracks to Lefferts Boulevard, which were eventually connected to the IND Fulton Street Line anyway, albeit past Grant Avenue.

BMT Fulton Street Line platforms 

Manhattan Junction was the original name for the Fulton Street Elevated platforms. It was located above Fulton and Sackman Streets, and was the second station to be built in the area of Broadway Junction. The station was built by the Kings County Elevated Railway on July 4, 1889. Manhattan Junction station had an island platform and two tracks, with a spur leading to the East New York Yard, as well as a side platform on the north side of the station that turned north along the East New York Loop, and ended on the south side of the BMT Jamaica Line platforms. The line was originally double tracked; a third track was added in the mid-1910s as part of the Dual Contracts expansion of the line between Nostrand Avenue and Hinsdale Street.

In 1938, the Independent Subway System began constructing their own Fulton Street Subway and added an underground subway station named Broadway–East New York station. Stations west of this point were being made obsolete as many were being replaced by the subway stations. The subway station opened in December 1946, and the elevated station above it closed on April 26, 1956, along with all other stations east of Rockaway Avenue. The ironwork for the old Fulton Elevated trackways can still be found over Fulton Street between Van Sinderen Avenue and Williams Place, and can be seen under this portion of the complex from the Canarsie Line platforms. The severed connection between the station and the East New York Yard can also be seen below the Canarsie Line and above the north side of Fulton Street.

Ridership
In 2016, the station had 3,085,401 boardings, making it the 166th most used station in the 422-station system. This amounted to an average of 9,189 passengers per weekday. In 2017, The New York Times wrote that 100,000 daily passengers used the station per day, meaning that the vast majority of passengers used the station to make transfers to other routes.

References

External links 

 
 
 

The Subway Nut:

 Broadway Junction – East New York (A,C) Pictures 
 Broadway Junction – Eastern Parkway (J,L,Z) Pictures 

Miscellaneous links:

 MTA's Arts For Transit — Broadway Junction
 Station Reporter — Broadway Junction Complex

Google Maps Street View:

 Van Sinderen Avenue entrance from Google Maps Street View  (the only entrance into the entire complex)
 Closed entrance to the Jamaica Line station on Eastern Parkway from Google Maps Street View 
 Canarsie Line platforms from Google Maps Street View 
 Jamaica Line platforms from Google Maps Street View 
 IND platforms from Google Maps Street View 

BMT Canarsie Line stations
BMT Jamaica Line stations
1885 establishments in New York (state)
IND Fulton Street Line stations
BMT Fulton Street Line stations
New York City Subway transfer stations
New York City Subway stations in Brooklyn
Railway stations in the United States opened in 1885
Bedford–Stuyvesant, Brooklyn
East New York, Brooklyn